Reverend William Milton Tryon (March 10, 1809 – November 16, 1847) was an American missionary, pastor, Baptist minister and co-founder of Baylor University. Together with some leading Baptist missionaries, Rev. James Huckins and Judge Robert Emmett Bledsoe Baylor, he inspired the formation of Christian education in Texas.

Background 
At the age of 9, Tryon lost his father and was 17 year old when he was baptized. Together with his mother he moved to Georgia in 1823 and was given a licence to preach. He was a graduate of Mercer Institute and in 1836 he was ordained as minister; he was preacher in Alabama and led five churches. Tryon together with Robert E. B. Baylor suggested the formation of Baptist Education Society in Texas and the Baptist College of Florida. He was chaplain of Texas Senate in 1843. He became the first president of board of trustees in Baylor University.

Baylor University establishment 

Tryon first suggested the establishment of Baylor University in Texas in 1841. The district lawyer, Judge R. E. B. Baylor, began promoting the idea and was supported by members of the Texas Baptist Education Society, which was affiliated with Union Baptist Association. The full-time fundraiser Rev. James Huckins, was the first missionary to Texas.

Tryon spent seven years as a leading Baptist in Texas. His dream was that Baylor University would be a Christian institution.

He later became second pastor of First Baptist Church in Houston and later he became the first resident missionary. He helped raised many churches and land in Texas. Tryon died of fever.

Further reading

Notes 

1809 births
1847 deaths
Baptist missionaries from the United States
Baptists from Texas
Baylor University founders
Baylor University people
Southern Baptist ministers
19th-century American clergy